Maxim or Maksim Naumov may refer to:
Maksim Naumov (born 1970), Russian football player
Maxim Naumov (figure skater) (born 2001), American figure skater